Jolande Swinkels (born 6 February 1966) is a Dutch sports shooter. She competed in the women's 10 metre air rifle event at the 1992 Summer Olympics.

References

1966 births
Living people
Dutch female sport shooters
Olympic shooters of the Netherlands
Shooters at the 1992 Summer Olympics
People from Boekel
Sportspeople from North Brabant